Slipknot is an American heavy metal band from Des Moines, Iowa. Originally formed under the name of The Pale Ones in September 1995, Slipknot have gone through multiple line-up changes, their lineup remained unaltered from 1999 until 2010 with the death of bassist Paul Gray and the departure of Joey Jordison in 2013. The line-up consists of vocalist Corey Taylor, guitarists Mick Thomson and Jim Root, percussionists Shawn Crahan and Chris Fehn, sampler Craig Jones and turntablist Sid Wilson, bassist Alessandro Venturella and drummer Jay Weinberg.

On June 29, 1999 they released their debut self-titled album Slipknot. "Wait and Bleed", a single from the album won a Kerrang! Award for Best Single in 2000 and also brought the band its first Grammy nomination for Best Metal Performance in 2001. Following the release of their second album Iowa, singles "Left Behind" and "My Plague" were also nominated for the Grammy Award for Best Metal Performance in 2002 and 2003 respectively. "My Plague" was also nominated for the Kerrang! Award for Best Video in 2002. On May 25, 2004 Slipknot released their third album Vol. 3: (The Subliminal Verses), which was nominated for Best Album in the 2004 Kerrang! Awards. In 2006, "Before I Forget" a single from the album brought the band their first Grammy Award for Best Metal Performance after six nominations. In 2008 then band released their fourth album All Hope Is Gone, "Psychosocial" single from the album brought the band their first MTV Video Music Awards nomination for Best Rock Video, as well as their seventh Grammy nomination in 2009. Slipknot received their first MTV Europe Music Awards nomination in the Rock Out category, also Kerrang! awarded the band the Kerrang! Icon award. Also in 2009 they received 6 nominations at the Kerrang! Awards, the most of any band that year and in Slipknot's history. Overall, Slipknot has received 25 awards from 59 nominations.

Emma-gaala

!Ref.
|-
| 2008
| Themselves
| Best Foreign Artist
| 
|

Fuse Awards
The Fuse Awards are arranged by Fuse TV and are decided by public vote. Slipknot has received one award from two nominations.

|-
| 2008 || "Psychosocial" || Best Video || 
|-
| 2009 || "Dead Memories" || Best Video ||

Grammy Awards
The Grammy Awards are awarded annually by the National Academy of Recording Arts and Sciences. Slipknot has received only 1 award from ten nominations.

|-
|  || "Wait and Bleed" ||rowspan="3"| Best Metal Performance || 
|-
|  || "Left Behind" || 
|-
|  || "My Plague" || 
|-
|rowspan="2"|  || "Duality" || Best Hard Rock Performance || 
|-
| "Vermilion" ||rowspan="5"| Best Metal Performance || 
|-
|  || "Before I Forget" || 
|-
|  || "Psychosocial" || 
|-
|  || "The Negative One" || 
|-
|rowspan="2"| 2016 || "Custer" || 
|-
| .5: The Gray Chapter || Best Rock Album ||

Heavy Music Awards

|-
|rowspan="4"| 2020 || Slipknot || Best Live Band || 
|-
| Slipknot || Best International Band || 
|-
| Unsainted || Best Video || 
|-
| We Are Not Your Kind || Best Album || 
|-

Hungarian Music Awards
The Hungarian Music Awards have been given to artists in the field of Hungarian music since 1992.

!Ref.
|-
| 2009
| All Hope Is Gone
| rowspan=3|Best Foreign Hard Rock or Metal Album
| 
| 
|-
| 2015
| .5: The Gray Chapter
| 
| 
|-
| 2020
| We Are Not Your Kind
| 
|

Kerrang! Awards
The Kerrang! Awards is an annual awards ceremony held by Kerrang!, a British rock magazine. Slipknot has won seven awards from twenty-four nominations.

|-
|rowspan="3"| 2000 || "Wait and Bleed" || Best Single || 
|-
|rowspan="2"| Slipknot || Best International Live Act || 
|-
| Best Band in the World || 
|-
| 2001 || Slipknot || Best Band in the World || 
|-
|rowspan="3"| 2002 || "My Plague" || Best Video || 
|-
|rowspan="2"| Slipknot || Best International Live Act || 
|-
| Best Band in the World || 
|-
|rowspan="4"| 2004 || Vol. 3: (The Subliminal Verses) || Best Album || 
|-
| "Duality" || Best Video || 
|-
|rowspan="2"| Slipknot || Best Live Band || 
|-
| Best Band on the Planet || 
|-
| 2005 || Slipknot || Best Live Band || 
|-
| 2008 || Slipknot || Kerrang! Icon || 
|-
|rowspan="6"| 2009 ||rowspan="2"| Slipknot || Best Live Band || 
|-
| Best International Band || 
|-
| "Dead Memories" ||rowspan="2"| Best Single || 
|-
| "Psychosocial" || 
|-
| "Sulfur" || Best Video || 
|-
| All Hope Is Gone || Best Album || 
|-
| 2010 || "Snuff" || Best Single || 
|-
|rowspan="3"| 2015||rowspan="3"| Slipknot || Best Event || 
|-
| Best Live Band  || 
|-
| Best International Band || 
|-
|rowspan="2"| 2019 ||rowspan="2"| "All Out Life" || Best Song || 
|-
| Best International Act || 
|-

Metal Hammer Golden God Awards
The Metal Hammer Golden Gods Awards is an annual awards ceremony held by Metal Hammer, a British heavy metal magazine. Slipknot has won three awards from nine nominations.

|-
| 2005 || Slipknot || Best Live Band || 
|-
| 2008 || Slipknot || Inspiration Award || 
|-
|rowspan="3"| 2009 ||rowspan="2"| Slipknot || Best Live Band || 
|-
| Best International Band || 
|-
| Mick Thomson & Jim Root || Shredder(s) || 
|-
| 2010 || Corey Taylor || Best Vocalist || 
|-
| 2011 || Joey Jordison || Best Drummer || 
|-
| 2012 || Slipknot || Best Comeback of the Year  || 
|-

MTV Europe Music Awards
The MTV Europe Music Awards is an annual awards ceremony established in 1994 by MTV Europe. Slipknot has received one nomination.

|-
| 2008 || Slipknot || Rock Out || 
|-

MTV Video Music Awards
The MTV Video Music Awards were established in 1984 by MTV to celebrate the top music videos of the year. Slipknot has received one nomination.

|-
| 2008 || "Psychosocial" || Best Rock Video || 
|-

NME
Founded by the music magazine NME, the NME Awards are awarded annually. Slipknot has received three awards.

NME Premier Awards

|-
| 2000 || Slipknot || Brightest Hope || 
|-

NME Carling Awards

|-
|rowspan="2"| 2002 || Iowa || Best Album || 
|-
| Slipknot || Best Metal Band || 
|-

NME Awards 2020

|-
|rowspan="2"| 2020 || We Are Not Your Kind || Best Album In The World || 
|-
| Slipknot || Best Band In The World || 
|-

Pollstar Concert Industry Awards
The Pollstar Concert Industry Awards is an annual award ceremony to honor artists and professionals in the concert industry.

!Ref.
|-
| 2009
| All Hope Is Gone World Tour
| Most Creative Tour Package
| 
|

Revolver Golden Gods Awards
The Revolver Golden Gods Awards is an annual awards ceremony held by Revolver, an American hard rock and heavy metal magazine. Slipknot has won Five awards. Lead Singer/Frontman Corey Taylor has won one.

|-
|rowspan="2"| 2009 || Slipknot || Best Live Band || 
|-
| "Psychosocial" || Best Riff || 
|-
|rowspan="1"| 2012 || Slipknot || Comeback of the Year || 
|-
|rowspan="3"| 2013 ||rowspan="2"| Slipknot || Most Dedicated Fans  || 
|-
| Best Live Band || 
|-
| Corey Taylor || Best Vocalist ||

Total Guitar Readers Awards
The Total Guitar Readers Awards is an annual awards ceremony held by Total Guitar, a British guitar magazine. Slipknot has won three awards from three nominations.

|-
|rowspan="3"| 2008 ||rowspan="2"| "Psychosocial" || Best Video || 
|-
| Solo of the Year || 
|-
| Fender Jim Root Telecaster || Hottest Guitar || 
|-

Žebřík Music Awards

!Ref.
|-
| 2001
| rowspan=2|Slipknot
| Best International Surprise
| 
| 
|-
| 2015
| Best International Group
| 
|

References

4th Annual Loudwire Music Awards: Complete Winners List

External links
 Slipknot official website

Awards
Slipknot